Harrowgate may refer to:

 Harrowgate, Philadelphia, United States, a neighborhood of Philadelphia
 Harrowgate Hill, a suburb of Darlington in the north of England
 Harrowgate Village in the Borough of Darlington in the north of England

See also
 Harrogate, a town in North Yorkshire, England
 Harrogate (disambiguation)